Events in the year 1589 in Norway.

Incumbents
Monarch: Christian IV

Events
Oktober 28 – James VI of Scotland arrive in Flekkefjord by ship.
November 23 – James VI married Anne of Denmark at the Bishop's Palace in Oslo.
December 22 – James VI and Anne of Denmark leaves Oslo by sled to Copenhagen.

Arts and literature

Births

Deaths
 Christen Mule, merchant and Mayor of Oslo.

See also

References

Sources